Miguel Ángel Garrido Cifuentes (born 5 October 1990), commonly known as Cifu, is a Spanish professional footballer who plays as a right back for Malaysia Super League club Kelantan.

Football career
Born in Zújar, Granada, Andalusia, Cifu graduated from Elche CF's youth setup, and made his senior debut for Torrellano Illice CF (the club's farm team) in Tercera División, in 2009. On 11 August 2011 he joined Orihuela CF in Segunda División B, appearing regularly for the side.

In July 2012 Cifu returned to Elche, being assigned to the reserves in the fourth level. He appeared in 38 matches during his first campaign, scoring once and achieving promotion.

On 17 July 2014 Cifu was loaned to Segunda División's Girona FC, in a season-long deal. On 24 August he made his debut in the competition, starting in a 1–0 home win against Racing de Santander.

Cifu scored his first professional goal on 9 May 2015, netting the last in a 4–2 away win against FC Barcelona B. After his loan expired, he was subsequently assigned to the Valencians' main squad.

On 26 January 2016, as his contract was due to expire in the summer, Cifu was loaned to La Liga side Málaga CF, with a three-year permanent deal being effective at the expiration of the loan. On 15 July, after making no appearances for the Andalusians, he returned to his previous club Girona again in a temporary deal.

On 30 January 2018, Cifu was loaned to Albacete Balompié still in the second division, for six months. Upon returning, he became a regular starter for the Albicelestes, now also in division two.

On 22 September 2020, Cifu terminated his contract with Málaga, and returned to his former side Elche, now in the top tier, on a two-year contract just hours later.

On 20 July 2021, Cifu left Elche and signed a one-year deal with second division newcomers UD Ibiza.

Personal life
Cifu is part of the Hipster subculture, distinguishing himself with a thick beard and tattoos.

Career statistics

Club

References

External links

1990 births
Living people
Sportspeople from the Province of Granada
Spanish footballers
Footballers from Andalusia
Association football defenders
La Liga players
Segunda División players
Segunda División B players
Tercera División players
Orihuela CF players
Elche CF Ilicitano footballers
Girona FC players
Elche CF players
Málaga CF players
Albacete Balompié players
UD Ibiza players